Turner Anderson Gill (December 8, 1841 – July 18, 1919) was a Democratic Mayor of Kansas City from 1875 to 1876.

Biography
Gill was born in Bath County, Kentucky on a farm.  He received a law degree from the University of Missouri.

During the American Civil War he fought on the Confederate side and was wounded at the Battle of Corinth and Battle of Champion's Hill in Mississippi.  He was captured at Vicksburg, Mississippi.  After being exchanged he joined General Shelby's regiment, was promoted to captain, and participated in the Battle of Westport.

During his term as mayor he inherited a city that was deeply in debt and having to pay its bills with script. He successfully reestablished Kansas City's credit, earning him the nickname "Little Giant of the Third Ward."

After serving as mayor he was a city counselor and became a circuit court judge.

He is buried in Elmwood Cemetery in Kansas City.

References

1841 births
1919 deaths
University of Missouri alumni
Mayors of Kansas City, Missouri
People from Bath County, Kentucky
19th-century American politicians